C. R.  Gummow Public School is a public elementary school in Cobourg, Ontario, Canada. It offers instruction from Junior Kindergarten to grade 8 and in French immersion from senior kindergarten to grade 8. The school is part of the Kawartha Pine Ridge District School Board and  had 703 students.

The school underwent a 20 million dollar project to rebuild the school on the existing property in January 2013; construction started in November 2013 and the school opened to students and staff on March 23, 2015. The old buildings were demolished by May and the yard has not yet been completed. The school principal was Ms. Kneen from 2003 to 2015, and Ms. White from 2015 to 2016.

References

External links

Elementary schools in Ontario